Mingxing (formerly Taigu or Taiku) is a town and township-level division and seat of Taigu County, Shanxi, China. It is a seat of a third order administration division. It has a total population of 60,500 people, of which 43,988 are urban dwellers. The language spoken by majority is Standard Manderin.

Landmarks
The town is called "Mingxing" which means “Ming Star (Town)” or literally "Bright Star (Town)". There are numerous temples in the city dated to the Ming dynasty, such as the Dacheng Hall of the Temple of Confucius of Taigu. Its Wubian White Tower is also of note.

References

Township-level divisions of Shanxi
Taigu County